Federal Route 66 is a federal road in Kelantan, Malaysia, linking the town of Jeli to the village of Kampung Bukit Tebok to Manek Urai.

Route background
The kilometre zero of the Federal Route 66 is located at Jeli. At the first kilometre at Jeli, it is connected with the Federal Route 4.

Features

At most sections, the Federal Route 66 was built under the JKR R5 road standard, allowing maximum speed limit of up to 90 km/h.

List of junctions and towns

References

Malaysian Federal Roads